Hydrotalea flava is a bacterium from the genus of Hydrotalea which has been isolated from industry distilled water from Sweden.

References

Chitinophagia
Bacteria described in 2011